The following is a list of episodes from the BBC television series, Extras.

In total, there are thirteen episodes of Extras (six in each series and one 90-minute Christmas special).

Extras was created by Ricky Gervais and Stephen Merchant, they also directed and starred in this series.

Series overview

Episodes

Series 1 (2005)

Series 2 (2006)

Christmas special (2007)

References

External links

Lists of British sitcom episodes
BBC-related lists